Desron Maloney (born 5 May 1991) is a West Indian cricketer. He made his List A debut on 7 November 2019, for the Windward Islands in the 2019–20 Regional Super50 tournament. He made his first-class debut on 9 January 2020, for the Windward Islands in the 2019–20 West Indies Championship.

References

External links
 

1991 births
Living people
Saint Vincent and the Grenadines cricketers
Windward Islands cricketers
Place of birth missing (living people)